Saharan Spanish is the variety of the Spanish language spoken in Western Sahara and adjacent regions. This non-native variety is heavily influenced by both Spanish cultural links and a strong expatriate community who live in Spain and Hispanic America, particularly Cuba.

History

Although the native and dominant languages in Western Sahara are Hassaniya Arabic and some Berber languages, Spanish was introduced by settlers in Spanish West Africa and Spanish Sahara in the 19th century.

Current usage and legal status
Spanish still influences Sahrawi society today and is the preferred second language for acquisition and government. Although Arabic and Spanish are both official languages of Sahrawi Arab Democratic Republic, Arabic is the sole official language in their constitution and the republic only uses Spanish for radio and TV broadcasts and state journalism.

Spanish vocabulary has entered Hassaniya, particularly in fields related to agriculture, automobiles, diet, and sanitation. These loanwords are reinforced due to Sahrawis studying abroad in Hispanic lands and returning to either Western Sahara or the Sahrawi refugee camps.

Lexicon 

Regarding the lexicon, the preference for Hispanisms in the framework of technique and tools has been documented, just as other countries have opted for solutions of the colonizing language such as English or French.

See also

Western Saharan literature in Spanish
Equatoguinean Spanish

References

Further reading
Aaiun, gritando lo que se siente. Antología poética (2006), published by the University of Madrid, 
Awah, Bahia Mahmud. Literatura del Sahara Occidental. Breve estudio (2008), 
Awah, Bahia Mahmud. Tiris, rutas literarias (April 2016), published by Última Línea, 
Awah, Bahia Mahmud. Versos refugiados (2007), published by Universidad Alcalá De Henares, 
Awah, Bahia Mahmud and Moya, Conchi. El porvenir del español en el Sahara Occidental (2009), 
Budda, Abdurrahaman. Huellas del castellano en el dialecto del hassaniyya saharaui (2012).
Gil, Victoria Retratos saharauis (2011)
San Martin, Pablo and Bollig, Ben (eds.) Los colores de la espera : Antología de nueva poesía sahraui (2011), published in Hudson by Comodoro Rivadavia, 
Treinta y uno, Thirty-One : Antología poetíca (2007), published by Sandblast and the University of Leeds, .
Um Draiga : Poesía sahraui contemporánea (2007), published in Zaragoza by Um Draiga.
VerSáhara, 2016. Varios autores canarios y saharauis (November 2016), published by Cuadernos de La Gueldera, Las Palmas de Gran Canaria,

External links

Um Draiga, a Sahrawi expatriate organization in Spain that publishes Spanish-language Sahrawi literature and poetry 

Spanish dialects
Spanish
Spanish language in Africa